W&G may refer to:

Wallace and Gromit, British television programme
Will & Grace, American situation comedy
W&G Records, Australian company
Wandel & Goltermann, owners of Wavetek